Reinhardt Canyon is located in the Lakeview Mountains, just west of Hemet in Riverside County, California. 

The prehistoric petroglyph known as the Hemet Maze Stone, California Historical Landmark No. 557, is located in the canyon.

References

Canyons and gorges of California
Landforms of Riverside County, California
Hemet, California
Archaeological sites in California